Bogdan Nedeljković (born April 1, 2000) is a Serbian professional basketball player for CB Marbella of the LEB Plata.

Early career  
Nedeljković started to play basketball for youth teams of his hometown team KK Loznica. In 2015, he joined the youth system of Mega Basket from Belgrade. He won the Junior ABA League Championship in the 2017–18 season with the U19 team. Over six tournament games, he averaged 7.3 points, 4.5 rebounds and 1.7 assists per game.

Professional career 
In August 2018, Nedeljković signed a contract with Bosnian club Igokea.

National team career 
Nedeljković was a member of the Serbian U16 team at the 2016 FIBA Europe Under-16 Championship. Nedeljković was a member of the Serbian U18 team that won the gold medal at the 2018 FIBA Europe Under-18 Championship in Latvia.

References

External links 
 
 Profile at realgm.com
 Profile at aba-liga.com
 Profile at serbiahoop.com
 Profile at euroleague.net

2000 births
Living people
ABA League players
Basketball League of Serbia players
CB Marbella players
KK Igokea players
KK Vršac players
OKK Konstantin players
Sportspeople from Loznica
Power forwards (basketball)
Serbian expatriate basketball people in Bosnia and Herzegovina
Serbian expatriate basketball people in Spain
Serbian men's basketball players
Small forwards